Al-Khutoot Al-Jawiya Sport Club, is an Iraqi football team based in Al-A'amiriya, Baghdad, that plays in the Iraq Division Two.

Managerial history
 Jamal Abdullah

See also
 2012–13 Iraq FA Cup
 2015–16 Iraq FA Cup
 2016–17 Iraq FA Cup
 2018–19 Iraq FA Cup

References

External links
 Al-Khutoot Al-Jawiya SC on Goalzz.com
 Iraq Clubs- Foundation Dates

Football clubs in Iraq
Sport in Baghdad
Football clubs in Baghdad